Lieutenant General Charles Bertody  Stone III (March 28, 1904 – May 17, 1992) was an officer in the US Air Force.  During World War II, he served as Chief of Staff, Headquarters Army Air Forces, China-Burma-India Theater.  During the Cold War, he served as Commander, Continental Air Command, Mitchel Field, New York between 1955-1957.

Biography
He was born in Fort McPherson, Georgia on March 28, 1904.

Early career

General Stone graduated from the U.S. Military Academy on June 14, 1927 and was commissioned a second lieutenant of Infantry.

In September 1927, General Stone was assigned with the 9th Infantry at Fort Sam Houston, Texas. Entering the Primary Flying School at Brooks Field, Texas in March 1929, he graduated from the Advanced Flying School at Kelly Field, Texas a year later and was then assigned with the 11th Bomb Squadron at Rockwell Field, California. Entering the Air Corps Technical School at Chanute Field, Illinois in September 1931, he graduated the following June and remained there as assistant to the director, Department of Mechanics.

Assigned with the 64th Service Squadron at March Field, California in September 1932, and the following month, General Stone joined the 31st Bomb Squadron there. A year later, he became post operations and engineering officer at Hamilton Field, California. From February to May 1934, he was an air mail pilot at Oakland, California, and then joined the 70th Service Squadron at Hamilton Field, assuming command of it in July 1936. General Stone was named engineering officer of the 7th Bomb Group there in October 1936.

Going to Luke Field, Hawaii in July 1937, General Stone was station and group engineering officer and later became post and group material officer. Transferred to Wright Field, Ohio in July 1939, he became a unit chief in the Field Service Section.

Entering the Air Corps Tactical School at Field, Alabama in April 1940, General Stone graduated the following June and returned to Wright Field as chief of the supply branch, Air Service Command, after which he was assigned with the Maintenance and Supply Division in the Office of the Assistant Chief of Air Staff at Air Corps headquarters, Washington, D.C.

World War II
Ordered to the China-Burma-India Theater in August 1943, General Stone was appointed chief of staff for the Eastern Air Command there the following January. In June 1945, he was sent to China to organize new headquarters for the 14th Air Force Flying Tigers, assuming command of it two months later. Upon its deactivation that December, General Stone was ordered back to Washington for temporary duty with the U.S. Strategic Bombing Survey.

Cold War
Joining the Air Defense Command in February 1946, General Stone assumed command of the 2nd Air Force at Colorado Springs, Colorado. The following month he was named deputy commander and chief of staff (relieved of latter duty on September 1, 1947) of the Air Defense Command at Wright-Patterson Air Force Base, Ohio, on October 6, 1947, he became director of maintenance, supply and services, and in December 1950 was appointed assistant to the commander.

The following month, General Stone moved to Air Force headquarters, Washington, D.C. as director of maintenance, supply & services in the Office of the Deputy Chief of Staff for Materiel. In April 1951, he was designated assistant for materiel program control to the Deputy Chief of Staff for Materiel. Named special assistant to the Deputy Chief of Staff, Comptroller in July 1951, later that month General Stone became deputy chief of staff, Comptroller, U.S. Air Force headquarters.

Moving to Continental Air Command, Mitchel Air Force Base, New York, on December 15, 1955, General Stone became commander and on April 1, 1956 was assigned additional duty as senior Air Force member, Military Staff Committee, United Nations. On July 2, 1956, he also became chairman, U.S. delegate, United Nations Military Staff Committee.

He retired on June 30, 1957 and died on May 17, 1992 in Tucson, Arizona.

Decorations and awards
His decorations include the Distinguished Service Medal with oak leaf cluster, Legion of Merit, Distinguished Flying Cross, Bronze Star with oak leaf cluster, British Order of the Bath (Companion), Chinese Tasheu Cloud Banner Medal and Lo Shu decoration. He is rated a command pilot and aircraft observer.

President of the Harvard Business School Club of Washington, D.C., in 1953 and 1954, and a member of the executive council of the Harvard Business School Association from July 1955 to July 1958, General Stone has been a director of the Air Force Aid Society, and appointed chairman of the board of the 14th Air Force Association from 1954 to 1957.

Promotions
 1942-01-05 	Lieutenant-Colonel   
 1943-09-22 	Colonel  
 1943-11-11 	Brigadier-General 
 1945-03-20 	Major-General

Assignments
 1941-12-13 	–	1942-10-20 	Chief of Supply Branch, Field Service Section, Air Corps Material Division
 1942-10-21 	–	1942-12-15 	Executive for Supply, Field Service Section, Air Corps Material Division
 1942-12-15 	–	1943-02-XX 	Chief of Accessories Section, Maintenance Division, Air Service Command
 1943-02-10 	–	1943-08-09 	Chief of Maintenance & Supply Division, Headquarters US Army Air Forces
 1943-08-23 	–	1945-08-09 	Chief of Staff, Eastern Air Command, China-Burma-India Theater of Operations
 1945-08-10 	–	1945-11-29 	Commanding General 14th Air Force [China]
 1945-11-30 	–	1946-01-14 	Special duty with the Strategic Bombing Survey, US Army Air Forces in the China
 1946-02-21 	–	1946-03-18 	Commanding General 2nd Air Force
 1946-03-XX 	–	1947-10-XX 	Deputy Commanding General Air Defense Command
 1946-03-XX 	–	1947-10-XX 	Chief of Staff, Air Defense Command
 1947-10-14 	–	1951-01-XX 	Director of Supply & Maintenance, Air Material Command
 1951-01-18 	–	1951-07-08 	Director of Maintenance, Supply & Services, Office of the Deputy Chief of Staff for Material, Headquarters US Air Force
 1951-07-09 	–	1951-07-27 	Special Assistant to Deputy Chief of Staff, Comptroller, Headquarters US Air Force
 1951-07-28 	–	1955-12-14 	Deputy Chief of Staff, Comptroller, Headquarters US Air Force
 1955-12-15 	–	1957-06-30 	Commanding General Continental Air Command
 1956-04-01 	–	1957-06-30 	Senior Air Force Representative to the United Nations Military Staff Committee
 1956-07-02 	–	1957-06-30 	Chairman of the US Delegation to the United Nations Military Staff Committee
 1957-06-30 			Retired

References

 Charles Bertody Stone, III (1904 - 1992)
   Military Service Information

United States Air Force generals
United States Military Academy alumni
1992 deaths
1904 births
Recipients of the Distinguished Flying Cross (United States)
Recipients of the Legion of Merit
Harvard Business School people
Military personnel from Georgia (U.S. state)